The Ickes Mountains are a series of coastal mountains that extend west from Strauss Glacier for  in Marie Byrd Land, Antarctica. The mountains were discovered from aircraft of the U.S. Antarctic Service on 18 December 1940. The name Ickes Mountains, after U.S. Secretary of the Interior Harold L. Ickes, appeared in the maps and reports resulting from this expedition although Ickes objected and never acquiesced to the use. Nonetheless, the name became established in usage and in 1966 was approved by the Advisory Committee on Antarctic Names. The U.S. Antarctic Service was established in the Division of Territories and Island Possessions of the Department of the Interior in 1939, during the period (1933–46) that Ickes was secretary.

References

Mountain ranges of Marie Byrd Land